MyGolf is Australia's National junior golf program run by Golf Australia.

Minjee Lee and Jason Day are program ambassadors.

External links
 Golf Australia, official site
 MYGolf, official site
 Junior Golf Queensland, MYGolf announcement

Youth sport in Australia